Marmande is a commune in the Lot-et-Garonne département in south-western France.

Marmande may also refer to:

 a French tomato cultivar originating from the commune of Marmande

People with the surname
 Francis Marmande (born 1945), a French author, musician and journalist 
 René de Marmande (1875–1949), a French journalist and anarchist

See also